The Europe/Africa Zone is one of three zones of regional Davis Cup competition in 2008.

Group I

Group II

Luxembourg, Greece, Morocco, and Tunisia relegated to Group III in 2009.
South Africa and Ukraine promoted to Group I in 2009.

Group III

Venue 1
Venue: Tennis Club Lokomotiv, Plovdiv, Bulgaria (clay)
Date: 9–13 April
Withdrawn: Botswana and Nigeria

Bulgaria and Montenegro promoted to Group II in 2009.
Côte d'Ivoire and Zimbabwe relegated to Group IV in 2009.

Venue 2
Venue: Master Class Tennis and Fitness Club, Yerevan, Armenia (clay)
Date: 7–11 May

Scores in italics carried over from pools.

Note: Tie between Bosnia & Herzegovina, Lithuania, and Estonia (Pool B) broken on number of rubbers won.  Tie between Andorra, Armenia, and Ghana (6th–8th) broken on number of rubbers won.

Moldova and Lithuania promoted to Group II for 2009. 
Armenia and Ghana relegated to Group IV for 2009.

Group IV
Venue: Master Class Tennis and Fitness Club, Yerevan, Armenia (clay)
Date: Week commencing 28 April
 Withdrawn: Libya, Malta, and Mauritius

Iceland, Namibia, San Marino, and Rwanda promoted to Group III for 2009.

See also
Davis Cup structure

 
2008 Davis Cup
Davis Cup Europe/Africa Zone